Stephen O'Hara (born 21 February 1971) is a Scottish former professional footballer who played in the Football League for Walsall.

References

1971 births
Living people
Scottish footballers
Association football defenders
English Football League players
Walsall F.C. players